Peragrarchis syncolleta is a moth in the family Carposinidae. It is found in India (Andaman Islands) and Japan.

References

Natural History Museum Lepidoptera generic names catalog

Carposinidae
Moths described in 1928